Eagle Award may refer to:

Eagle Award (comics), an annual set of comic book awards
The highest rank of the Zambia Scouts Association

See also
Eagle Scout (disambiguation)
Golden Eagle Award (disambiguation)